Mychal Kearse (born November 28, 1983) is an American former professional basketball player. He played college basketball at Mount St. Mary's University and high school basketball at Providence Day School.

College statistics

|-
| style="text-align:left;"| 2003-04
| style="text-align:left;"| Mount St. Mary's
|29 ||23  || 25.1 ||.376 ||.200  || .707 ||5.59  ||1.93 || 1.31 ||0.10  ||6.52
|-
| style="text-align:left;"| 2004-05
| style="text-align:left;"| Mount St. Mary's
|27 || 27 || 27.4 ||.474 || .333 ||.659|| 6.48 ||2.11 || 1.07 || 0.00 || 8.96
|-
| style="text-align:left;"| 2005-06
| style="text-align:left;"|Mount St. Mary's
|28  || 28 || 26.7 ||.408 ||.243  ||.772||7.93  ||1.64 || 1.64 || 0.46 || 10.57
|-
| style="text-align:left;"| 2006-07
| style="text-align:left;"|Mount St. Mary's
|29  || 29 || 30.4 ||.404 ||.154  ||.802||5.90  ||1.66 || 1.34 || 0.28 || 11.48
|-
|-
|- class="sortbottom"
! style="text-align:center;" colspan=2|  Career 

!113 ||107 || 27.4 ||.414 || .237 ||.746  || 6.46 ||1.83  || 1.35 ||0.21  ||9.38
|-

NCAA Awards & Honors
NEC Defensive POY - 2006, 2007
NEC All-Rookie Team - 2004

Career statistics

Regular season

|-
| align="left" | 2008-09
| align="left" | SISU 
|15 ||   || 29.9 ||.447  || .212 ||.714  || 8.3 || 1.7 || 2.7 ||0.3  ||21.7 
|-
| align="left" | 2009-10
| align="left" | SISU 
|26 ||   || 35.7 ||.479  || .230 ||.833  || 7.3 || 2.2 || 2.0 ||0.2  ||23.0 
|-
| align="left" | 2011-12
| align="left" | Akita
|26 ||17 || 21.0 ||.367  || .219 ||.733  || 5.4 || 2.6 || 1.3 ||0.2  ||9.4 
|-
| align="left" | 2011-12
| align="left" | Sibiu
|12 ||1 || 27.1 ||.485  || .378 ||.768  || 6.25 || 2.17 || 1.42 ||0.33  ||18.50 
|-

Playoffs 

|-
|style="text-align:left;"|2008-09
|style="text-align:left;"|SISU
| 2 ||  || 28.0 || .346 || .125 || .625 || 4.0 || 1.5 || 2.0 || 0.0 || 12.0
|-
|style="text-align:left;"|2009-10
|style="text-align:left;"|	SISU
|2 ||  || 36.0|| .500 || .273 || .909 || 8.5 || 3.0 || 4.5 || 1.0 || 28.5
|-
|style="text-align:left;"|2011-12
|style="text-align:left;"|	Akita
| 4 ||  || 18.3|| .348 || .222 || 1.000 || 5.0 || 4.3 || 1.0 || 0.0 || 5.0
|-

External links
Akita vs Sendai

Photo
Kearse visiting a company

References

1983 births
Living people
Akita Northern Happinets players
American expatriate basketball people in Colombia
American expatriate basketball people in Denmark
American expatriate basketball people in Japan
American expatriate basketball people in Lebanon
American expatriate basketball people in Romania
Basketball players from North Carolina
Mount St. Mary's Mountaineers men's basketball players
American men's basketball players
Guards (basketball)